This article is about the list of Clube Desportivo da Huíla players. C.D. Huíla is an Angolan football (soccer) club based in Lubango, Huíla, Angola and plays at Estádio do Ferroviário. The club was established in 1998.

2020–2021
C.D. Huíla players 2020–2021

2011–2021
C.D. Huíla players 2011–2021

2001–2010
C.D. Huíla players 2001–2010

External links
 Facebook profile

References

C.D. Huíla
C.D. Huíla players
Association football player non-biographical articles